Porter Lynn Duong is an American actress. She is best known for her recurring role as Hien on NBC's This Is Us.

Early life 
Porter was born in San Jose, California to a Vietnamese family. She graduated from the University of California at Davis with a degree in psychology.

Career 
Porter made her film debut in the independent film Touch, for which she received the Boston International Film Festival Indie Spirit Best Actress Award. She has appeared on HBO's Silicon Valley (as Gina), on multiple episodes of the show This Is Us (as Hien), and on the CW series Ringer. She has also acted in multiple sketches and web series from Youtube stars such as Wong Fu Productions (Flashbackattack and Meet The Kayak) and The Fung Brothers (18 Types of Asian Girls).

References 

1983 births
Living people
American actresses
21st-century American actresses
Actresses from California
People from San Jose, California
University of California, Davis alumni
American people of Vietnamese descent